In topology and related areas of mathematics, a subset A of a topological space X is said to be dense in X if every point of X either belongs to A or else is arbitrarily "close" to a member of A — for instance, the rational numbers are a dense subset of the real numbers because every real number either is a rational number or has a rational number arbitrarily close to it (see Diophantine approximation). 
Formally,  is dense in  if the smallest closed subset of  containing  is  itself. 

The  of a topological space  is the least cardinality of a dense subset of

Definition

The smallest closed subset of  containing  is  itself.
That is, 
For every  every neighborhood  of  intersects  that is, 
 intersects every non-empty open subset of 

and if  is a basis of open sets for the topology on  then this list can be extended to include:
For every  every  neighborhood  of  intersects 
 intersects every non-empty

Density in metric spaces

An alternative definition of dense set in the case of metric spaces is the following.

Then  is dense in  if 

If  is a sequence of dense open sets in a complete metric space,  then  is also dense in   This fact is one of the equivalent forms of the Baire category theorem.

Examples

The real numbers with the usual topology have the rational numbers as a countable dense subset which shows that the cardinality of a dense subset of a topological space may be strictly smaller than the cardinality of the space itself. The irrational numbers are another dense subset which shows that a topological space may have several disjoint dense subsets (in particular, two dense subsets may be each other's complements), and they need not even be of the same cardinality. Perhaps even more surprisingly, both the rationals and the irrationals have empty interiors, showing that dense sets need not contain any non-empty open set. The intersection of two dense open subsets of a topological space is again dense and open. 
The empty set is a dense subset of itself. But every dense subset of a non-empty space must also be non-empty. 

By the Weierstrass approximation theorem, any given complex-valued continuous function defined on a closed interval  can be uniformly approximated as closely as desired by a polynomial function. In other words, the polynomial functions are dense in the space  of continuous complex-valued functions on the interval  equipped with the supremum norm.

Every metric space is dense in its completion.

Properties 

Every topological space is a dense subset of itself. For a set  equipped with the discrete topology, the whole space is the only dense subset. Every non-empty subset of a set  equipped with the trivial topology is dense, and every topology for which every non-empty subset is dense must be trivial.

The image of a dense subset under a surjective continuous function is again dense. The density of a topological space (the least of the cardinalities of its dense subsets) is a topological invariant.

A topological space with a connected dense subset is necessarily connected itself.

Continuous functions into Hausdorff spaces are determined by their values on dense subsets: if two continuous functions  into a Hausdorff space  agree on a dense subset of  then they agree on all of 

For metric spaces there are universal spaces, into which all spaces of given density can be embedded: a metric space of density  is isometric to a subspace of  the space of real continuous functions on the product of  copies of the unit interval.

Related notions 

A subset without isolated points is said to be dense-in-itself.

Equivalently, a subset of a topological space is nowhere dense if and only if the interior of its closure is empty. The interior of the complement of a nowhere dense set is always dense. The complement of a closed nowhere dense set is a dense open set. The rational numbers, while dense in the real numbers, are meagre as a subset of the reals.

A topological space with a countable dense subset is called separable. A topological space is a Baire space if and only if the intersection of countably many dense open sets is always dense. A topological space is called resolvable if it is the union of two disjoint dense subsets. More generally, a topological space is called κ-resolvable for a cardinal κ if it contains κ pairwise disjoint dense sets.

An embedding of a topological space  as a dense subset of a compact space is called a compactification of 

A topological space  is hyperconnected if and only if every nonempty open set is dense in  A topological space is submaximal if and only if every dense subset is open.

If  is a metric space, then a non-empty subset  is said to be -dense if

One can then show that  is dense in  if and only if it is ε-dense for every

See also

References

proofs

General references

 
  
  
  
 
  

General topology